Bhairon Prasad Mishra is a member of the Bharatiya Janata Party and has won the 2014 Indian general elections from the Banda (Lok Sabha constituency).

Bhairon Prasad Mishra was born on 7 September 1958. His birthplace is Hanuva, Chitrakoot District, (Uttar Pradesh).

References

Living people
India MPs 2014–2019
People from Banda district, India
Lok Sabha members from Uttar Pradesh
Bharatiya Janata Party politicians from Uttar Pradesh
1958 births
People from Chitrakoot district